Janis Vahter (born 21 January 1991 in Tallinn, Estonia) is an Estonian professional basketball player. He is currently playing for TLÜ/Kalev at the small forward position.

Club career

Janis Vahter started his basketball career with Tallinna Kalev in 2004. He then played 3 seasons with Dalkia/Nybit (last season Triobet/Dalkia). For 2009-2010 season he joined BC Rakvere Tarvas and won his fifth KML medal. He has played for Tarvas for three seasons and has won most of his honours with the team, including being BBL Challenge Cup 2011-12 vice-champion.

Honours
Korvpalli Meistriliiga
Runner-up: 2009-10
3rd place: 2004-05, 2005–06, 2009–10, 2011-12
Estonian Basketball Cup
Runner-up: 2010–11
3rd place: 2011-12
BBL Challenge Cup
Runner-up: 2011-12

External links
 Profile at basket.ee
 Profile at bbl.net
 Profile at bctarvas.ee

References

1986 births
Living people
BC Rakvere Tarvas players
BC Tallinn Kalev players
Estonian men's basketball players
KK Pärnu players
Korvpalli Meistriliiga players
Small forwards